Barbie: Vacation Adventure is an unreleased adventure sports video game that takes Barbie on educational field trips throughout the United States.

The game would have been a commercial success; according to founder Richard Kay, Software Creations made a roughly £10,000 profit from it. Paul Tonge composed the music for the Super NES version.

Gameplay

The game is played using a side-scroller view similar to those found in most platformers.

In Wyoming, Barbie spends her time going on a camping trip. In her California home, she spends her days lounging in her apartment building. In Iowa, she goes to the local county carnival to help find an escaped pig. In Florida, she goes to the beach and plays volleyball and scuba diving. In Texas, Barbie plays with horseshoes. Barbie also has the option while enjoying the sights of Wyoming to ride on three different kinds of horses; each horse provides up to 23 frames of animation.

This game was planned to be part of the Sega Club collection; it is designed for younger female gamers in mind. On most of her trips, she travels with her best friend Midge Hadley, who the second player controls in two-player games.

Reception

Reviewing the Genesis version, GamePro commented that the graphics and sound effects are below average, but that the game is fun and educational for younger gamers.

References

Vacation Adventure
1994 video games
Adventure games
Hi Tech Expressions games
North America-exclusive video games
Cancelled Sega Genesis games
Cancelled Super Nintendo Entertainment System games
Video games developed in the United Kingdom
Video games set in the United States
Multiplayer and single-player video games
Works about vacationing